Stachowo  is a settlement in Gmina Miastko, Bytów County, Pomeranian Voivodeship, in northern Poland.

From 1975 to 1998, the village was in Słupsk Voivodeship. It has a population of 4.

References

Map of the Gmina Miastko

Stachowo